The Burg Griffen is a castle on a 130m/427 ft-high limestone mountain above the town of Griffen in the Austrian state of Carinthia.

History 
The castle was built between 1124 and 1146 by order of Bishop Otto of Bamberg. In an 1160 deed, Emperor Friedrich I mentioned Grivena as a Bamberg property.

In 1292 the Carinthian nobleman Count Ulrich von Heunburg with support of Archbishop Konrad IV of Salzburg occupied the fort in an uprising against Albert of Habsburg, the son of King Rudolph I of Germany and Duke Meinhard II. However Ulrich was abandoned by his allies and one year later had to leave the castle.  In 1759 Bishop Adam Friedrich sold the Bamberg estates in Carinthia to Maria Theresa of Austria and the castle was incorporated into the Carinthian duchy.

About 1520 a large reconstruction of the castle took place as a protection against the threat posed by the Ottoman forces with a base amounted of about 4000 m2, though the Turks never laid siege to Griffen. In 1659, lightning struck one of the towers and the decay of the castle began. In 1768 a last religious service took place and about 1840 the roofs were torn. In 2000 the preservation of the castle began. A steep footpath leads up the mountain to the ruins.

Cave 
Within the mountain is the Griffener Tropfsteinhöhle (dripstone cave) with a length of 485m/1591 ft, which was not discovered until the late days of World War II. It is open to public and a natural landmark since 1957.

External links 
 Griffen at burgen.de

Castles in Carinthia (state)
Tourist attractions in Carinthia (state)